Kaisaniemi is a part of the centre of Helsinki, Finland. It is located immediately north of the Helsinki Central railway station and south of Hakaniemi. The most famous part of Kaisaniemi is the Kaisaniemi park, a park covering many hectares right in the city centre. Kaisaniemi is part of the Vironniemi district and neighbourhood of Kluuvi.

The Kaisaniemi district was first founded in the 1820s when Catharina "Cajsa" Wahllund founded a restaurant in the city centre. The restaurant, which survives to this day, later gave its name to the entire district. The reason for the similarity between the Finnish and Swedish names is that unlike almost every other district in central Helsinki, Kaisaniemi got a Finnish name first, and that name was copied into Swedish, with only a minor orthographic change.

As well as the park and the restaurant, Kaisaniemi has Kinopalatsi, the second largest movie theatre in Helsinki. It is also the site of the fine Helsinki Botanic Gardens and glasshouses. Kaisaniemi is served by the University of Helsinki metro station, opened in 1995. The Green League party of Finland traditionally holds their less formal events and happenings at the Restaurant Kaisaniemi.

See also 
 Caisa
 Kaisaniemi Park

References

Subdivisions of Helsinki